In computing, incremental search, hot search, incremental find or real-time suggestions is a user interface interaction method to progressively search for and filter through text. As the user types text, one or more possible matches for the text are found and immediately presented to the user. This immediate feedback often allows the user to stop short of typing the entire word or phrase they were looking for. The user may also choose a closely related option from the presented list.

The method of incremental search is sometimes distinguished from user interfaces that employ a modal window, such as a dialog box, to enter searches. For some applications, a separate user interface mode may be used instead of a dialog box.

History

The first documented use of incremental search was in EMACS on ITS in the late 1970s. This was one of the many essential Emacs features Richard Stallman included in his reimplementation, GNU Emacs.  Other noteworthy programs containing this functionality in the 1980s include bash and Canon Cat. These early implementations offered single line feedback, not lists of suggestions.

The first mainstream appearance may have been in the Speller for WordPerfect 5.2 for Windows, released 30 November 1992. As programmer Robert John Stevens, now CEO of WriteExpress, watched users at the WordPerfect Usability Lab in Orem, Utah use the 5.1 Speller that he and Steven M. Cannon ported to Windows, he noticed that when a word was not found in the dictionary and no alternative words were presented, users seemed lost, moved the mouse cursor around the page and even exited the Speller. Dumbstruck by the anomaly, he went home, sat on the couch and discussed his observations with his wife. Stevens coded the solution: as a user typed in the edit box, Speller would suggest words beginning with the letters entered.

Stevens' Spell Check program was also used in Novell GroupWise.

Variants 

This feature, or variations thereof, has also been referred to as Autocomplete, search as you type, filter/find as you type (FAYT), incremental search, typeahead search, inline search, instant search, word wheeling, and other names as well.

Some common keyboard shortcuts for incremental find are Ctrl/Cmd-F (like for traditional find), the GNU-style / (also applicable to Vim), or Emacs-style C-s.

Searches for files and media 

This user interface method is also employed in varying contexts. For example, a user may encounter this feature while searching for files whose names match a string in an operating system's file explorer shell. The feature may also be used during searches for songs whose name or artist match a string in a media player.

Searches for user interface elements 

Another variation is to filter through long lists of options or menu items that may appear within the user interface itself. Examples of this variation can be found in the about:config interface section of Mozilla Firefox version 2.0.0.14 and later versions; and in the bundle editor section of TextMate 1.5.7. This feature is also employed in application launchers such as Quicksilver 1.0.

Typically a list of matches is generated as the search query is typed, and the list is progressively narrowed to match the filter text.

Web search 

In September 2010, Google introduced Google Instant, an incremental search feature for Google Search.

Resource consumption
Incremental search on a non-local server, as in Web search, uses more network bandwidth and server processing than non-incremental search, due to the handling of XMLHttpRequests (or similar) which are typically fired from each onkeyup event.

Reception

Interface expert Jef Raskin has been a strong advocate of incremental search. In his 2000 book The Humane Interface, he wrote, "From the point of view of interface engineering, the advantages of incremental searching are so numerous and the advantages of delimited searches so few that I can see almost no occasions when a delimited search would be preferred." This was followed by a footnote reading, "A search is either incremental or excremental."

Incremental search has been criticised for exhibiting low affordance, as the text fields which provide it offer no visual indication of that fact until after the user begins typing.

Specific applications 
Non-modal incremental find is found in:

Modern web browsers:
 Firefox (since version 0.4)
 Opera
 Opera Mini
 Safari
 Chrome
 Internet Explorer 8
 Konqueror
 Midori

Instant messaging clients:
 Adium
 Windows Live Messenger

Modern operating systems:
 Apple's Mac OS X
 Spotlight (which searches the entire computer)
 Help menu (10.5 and newer)
 System Preferences
 Microsoft's Windows Vista and 7
 Start menu
 Control Panel
 Linux's KDE 4 desktop environment uses this systematically
 KWrite
 Rekonq
 BlackBerry OS (version 6.0.0 and newer)

Editors and development environments:
 Eclipse
 Emacs
 IntelliJ IDEA
 NetBeans IDE
 Sublime Text
 Vim
 Visual Studio

Other applications:
 Apple's iTunes
 Google Toolbar 5
 less
 Windows Media Player
 Quicksilver
 Blender's search menu (version 2.5 and newer)
 Clara.io's explorer search menu

See also

Autofill
Autocomplete
Context-sensitive user interface
Combo box
Search suggest drop-down list
Snippet (programming)

References

External links
Keyboard Feature: Find As You Type — Mozilla.
Incremental Search — Emacs.
Using Incremental Find — Eclipse.
Find As You Type Add-on — Internet Explorer
Inline Search Add-on — Internet Explorer
Tip #13 - Incremental search — Vim

User interface techniques
Search engine software